William Haydon (30 July 1872 – 19 April 1904) was a New Zealand cricketer. He played four first-class matches for Otago between 1895 and 1898.

See also
 List of Otago representative cricketers

References

External links
 

1872 births
1904 deaths
New Zealand cricketers
Otago cricketers
Cricketers from Dunedin